3-Methyl-3-pentanol (IUPAC name: 3-methylpentan-3-ol) is an organic chemical compound and a tertiary hexanol. It is used in the synthesis of the tranquilizer emylcamate, and has similar sedative and anticonvulsant actions itself.

Synthesis 
It can be prepared by reacting ethylmagnesium bromide with methyl acetate in the so-called Grignard reaction using dried diethyl ether or tetrahydrofuran as solvent.

It can be prepared also by reacting ethylmagnesium bromide with butanone in the same conditions already mentioned.

References 

Tertiary alcohols
Hexanols